Thelma Esperanza Aldana Hernández (born 27 September 1955) is a Guatemalan jurist and politician, former President of the Supreme Court and former Attorney General.

Life
Aldana was born in Gualán, eastern Guatemala, in 1955. She graduated from the University of San Carlos in Guatemala. She has a Master's degree in Civil and Procedural Law.
She started her career in 1984 as a janitor in a Family Court in Quetzaltenango.  In 2009 she became a judge in the Supreme Court. She served as the president of the Supreme Court from 2011-2012. In 2014 she replaced Claudia Paz y Paz as Guatemala’s attorney general. She is married.

Courts for violence against women 
In 2011, when she was president of the Supreme Court, Aldana started special courts in Guatemala for femicide cases. Killing women, and violence against women are rampant in Guatemala; every year there are on the average 56,000 reports of violence against women. Eleven districts now have the special courts. Judges and police officers receive special gender crime training.

Against corruption 
In 2015 Aldana led another investigation into government corruption. In this, she closely cooperated with the Commissioner of the UN International Commission against Impunity in Guatemala (CICIG), Iván Velásquez Gómez. As a result, the President of Guatemala, Otto Pérez Molina, was forced to resign.

Presidential campaign 
In 2019, Aldana entered the presidential election, campaigning on the platform of anti-corruption with new party Semilla. However, on 15 May, the Constitutional Court rejected her candidacy for President, since she had been charged with corruption, despite no evidence being presented. It's believed that the charges were presented to stop her candidacy and an eventual presidency since she was the front-runner.

Awards 
In 2015 Aldana won the Jaime Brunet Prize for the Promotion of Human Rights from the Public University of Navarra. The prize was for her work for women's rights, against gender violence, and for the rights of the indigenous peoples, as well as against political  corruption. The prize was 36,000 euros.

In 2016 she was recognised with an International Women of Courage Award by the US Secretary of State.

In 2018 she was awarded the Right Livelihood Award along with Iván Velásquez Gómez for "their innovative work [with CICIG] in exposing abuse of power and prosecuting corruption, thus rebuilding people’s trust in public institutions."

References  

 

1955 births
Living people
People from Zacapa Department
Guatemalan women judges
Attorneys general of Guatemala
Government ministers of Guatemala
Women government ministers of Guatemala
Universidad de San Carlos de Guatemala alumni
Recipients of the International Women of Courage Award
Female justice ministers
21st-century Guatemalan women politicians
21st-century Guatemalan politicians